Vecpiebalga is a village in Cēsis Municipality in the Vidzeme region of Latvia. Vecpiebalga had 501 residents as of 2017.

Vecpiebalga is an important village in Latvian cultural identity.

The first Latvian novel, "The Time of the Land Surveyors" (orig. Mērnieku laiki) was written by two school teachers, Reinis Kaudzīte and Matīss Kaudzīte, in Vecpiebalga. Written in 1879, the novel details the transition from a communal way of life to a more modern, individualistic way of life. The village was also an important center of weaving Latvian textiles. The ruins of Vecpiebalga Castle lie in the village.

References

Towns and villages in Latvia
Cēsis Municipality
Kreis Wenden
Vidzeme